The Pfeifferhorn is the  triangularly-shaped peak located in the most isolated part of the Lone Peak Wilderness Area of the Wasatch Mountains in northern Utah, United States. This rugged Utah mountain, commonly referred to as the Little Matterhorn, is the fifth-highest peak in the Wasatch Range. The summit can be reached by hiking, though some scrambling is required. There are several technical rock climbing routes with the north ridge being the most popular. This summit also makes an excellent winter mountaineering adventure.

Routes

The easiest and most popular route is the East Ridge via Red Pine Lake trail up Little Cottonwood Canyon. From here proceed southwest up the steep talus slope to the top of the 'false summit'. A well-defined trail should be visible here in the absence of snow. Continue west along the ridge through a series of large boulders to a second steep slope. You can either wrap around this slope to the south and switch-back up to the summit (easier) or just continue west until you reach the summit (steep).

Another way to climb Pfeifferhorn is to hike in through Maybird Gulch. A small foot bridge breaks off to the right from the Red Pine Lake trail and will take you into Maybird. You will pass three small lakes nestled under the Hogum Divide with the Pfeifferhorn rising straight ahead. Once past the uppermost lake you will find yourself in a large boulder field (granite talus) which is difficult and slow to cross. At the other side, a steep scramble will take you to the summit base. A loop trip can be made starting at Maybird Gulch, climbing to the peak, then down by way of upper/lower Red Pine lakes or vice versa.

Gallery

References

External links

Mountains of Utah
Mountains of Salt Lake County, Utah
Mountains of Utah County, Utah
Wasatch-Cache National Forest
Wasatch Range